Refah Supermarkets is an Iranian supermarket chain based in Tehran. The establishment has currently 730 branches across the nation. Refah is carrying a wide assortment of goods in the lines of Food & Beverages Fresh Produce, Hygienic & Cosmetics, Home Appliances & Electronics, Clothing & Textiles and Stationaries. The company slogan of Refah is "Better quality, lower prices." Online sales are provided for those customers who prefer to shop, compare and decide to purchase.
Also has branches in Iraq and Turkey . 
Refah, along with Shahrvand Supermarkets, and Carrefour-owned Hyperstar Market, create the bulk of Iranian retail industry.

References

External links
 Company Website

Supermarkets of Iran
Retail companies established in 1995
Iranian brands